The  Lintong East railway station is a railway station of Zhengxi Passenger Railway located in Lintong District, Xi'an, Shaanxi, China. The station is currently not in operation.

Railway stations in Shaanxi
Stations on the Xuzhou–Lanzhou High-Speed Railway